Mittagspitz is a mountain in Liechtenstein, close to the border with Switzerland in the Rätikon range of the Eastern Alps, east of the town of Balzers, with a height of .

References

 
 

Mountains of Liechtenstein
Mountains of the Alps